Bellas Vistas is an administrative neighborhood of Madrid, part of the district of Tetuán. As of 1 February 2020, it has a population of 29,993. It was created as slum of the north of the city, on the west side of the Road of France, currently the calle de Bravo Murillo.

References 
Citations

Bibliography
 

Wards of Madrid
Tetuán (Madrid)